Zavlekov is a municipality and village in Klatovy District in the Plzeň Region of the Czech Republic. It has about 400 inhabitants.

Administrative parts
Villages of Mladice, Plichtice, Skránčice and Vlčnov are administrative parts of Zavlekov.

Geography
It lies in the Blatná Uplands. The Úslava flows through the municipality. The territory is rich in ponds. The largest of them is the Hnačovský Pond, which, however, lies only partially in the municipality.

History
The first written mention of Zavlekov is from 1334.

Sights
A landmark of Zavlekov is a ruin of the old fortress from the 14th century. A part of the residential tower-shaped palace connected to the round bastion has been preserved. The new fortress was built in the centre of the village in the second half of the 16th century. Only the Gothic portal survived from it. A granary was built from the remains of the new fortress. It is protected as a technical monument.

The most important monument is the Church of the Holy Trinity. It was built in the Baroque style in 1773 on the site of an old Gothic church.

Notable people
Rudolf Mayer (1837–1865), poet

References

External links

Villages in Klatovy District